Keith Cutler,  is a Senior Circuit Judge

He has been the Resident Judge of Winchester and Salisbury since 2009. He was called to the Bar (Lincoln's Inn) in 1972. Cutler was appointed to be an Assistant Deputy Coroner for the purposes of conducting the inquest into the death of Mark Duggan on 4 August 2011. He has served as Secretary and then as President of the Council of Circuit Judges (COCJ). Cutler accepted the award of Commander of the British Empire in the 2010 New Years Honours List and has been a lay canon of Salisbury Cathedral since 2009.
Once he was called for jury service and denied exemption despite telling officials he was actually the judge presiding over the case.

Honours

Commonwealth honours
 Commonwealth honours

Scholastic

Honorary degrees

Personal life 
Keith Cutler has two children.

References

21st-century English judges
Living people
Year of birth missing (living people)
Circuit judges (England and Wales)